Thigmophryidae is a family of marine ciliates in the order Philasterida.

References

External links 
 

Philasterida
Ciliate families